River Hill Farm is a historic slave plantation located in Clarksville in Howard County, Maryland, United States.
River Hill Farm resided on a land tract patented as "Four Brothers Portion". The house was built in the 18th century out of field stone with stucco covering. Outbuilding included a slave quarters. The 500 acre property was the home of Major Henry Owings of Owingsville.

In 1972, Rouse used the River Hill farm as a game preserve while other sections were being developed. Howard Research and Development placed the Game Manager lived in the historic house. In 1974 The property was proposed for use as a landfill, but Alpha Ridge Landfill was selected. The house was not preserved or submitted for the historic registry by the Rouse Company. It was demolished for the development of Pointers Run.

See also
Clifton (Clarksville, Maryland)
John Due House

References

Houses in Howard County, Maryland
Clarksville, Maryland
Plantations in Maryland
Slave cabins and quarters in the United States